Ahmed Faras (born 7 December 1946) is a Moroccan former professional footballer who played as a striker for Chabab Mohammédia at club level and Morocco internationally.

Faras was named African Footballer of the Year in 1975. In 2006, Faras was selected by CAF as one of the best 200 African football players of the last 50 years.

Club career 
Faras played for Chabab Mohammédia between 1965 and 1982, winning the Moroccan League in 1981 and finishing as the league's top-scorer in 1969 and 1973. He retired in 1982, after spending 17 years with the club.

International career 
Faras was a member of Morocco national team from 1965 to 1979, wearing the captain's armband for eight consecutive years, starting from 1971. At international level, Faras took part in the 1970 FIFA World Cup in Mexico, and the 1972 Summer Olympics in Munich, before leading his team to African Cup of Nations success in 1976. Faras scored a total of 36 goals in 94 games for his national side.

1972 Summer Olympics 
The Moroccan national team was placed in Group A, with West Germany, Malaysia, United States. Ahmed Faras played a major role in the 1972 Summer Olympics. He was the top scorer for the Moroccan national team with 3 goals scored all against Malaysia making it his first and only hat-trick for the National team.

1976 Africa Cup Of Nations 
Morocco was placed in Group B. Morocco tied its first match against Sudan and won its second against Zaire. Morocco played the final game against Nigeria, to determine the group winner, and Morocco won by 3 goals to 1. In the final round Morocco defeated Egypt 2-1 with a goal scored by Faras in the 23rd minute. They played against Nigeria again and won 2-1 scored by Faras in the 82nd minute. Morocco was to play its final against Guinea and needed a tie to win the cup. The match ended in a tie and Morocco won the cup. Faras was named best player of the tournament and was the 2nd top goal-scorer.

Career statistics

International

Scores and results list Morocco's goal tally first, score column indicates score after each Morocco goal.

Honors
Chabab Mohammédia
Moroccan League: 1980
Coupe du Trône: 1972, 1975
Moroccan Super Cup: 1975
Maghreb Cup Winners Cup: 1973
Maghreb Cup Winners Cup runner-up: 1975

Morocco
1976 African Cup of Nations 
1974 Kuneitra Cup 
1976 Pan Arab Games

Individual
African Footballer of the Year : 1975 
Top Scorer in Moroccan League: 1969 (16 buts), 1973 (16 buts)
Best player of the Africa Cup of Nations: 1976
Africa Cup of Nations Team of the Tournament: 1976
Top Scorer 1974 Kuneitra Cup
 IFFHS All-time Morocco Men's Dream Team

Records
Morocco all-time top goalscorer
Chabab Mohammédia all-time top goalscorer

References

1946 births
Living people
Moroccan footballers
Morocco international footballers
1970 FIFA World Cup players
Competitors at the 1967 Mediterranean Games
Competitors at the 1971 Mediterranean Games
Footballers at the 1972 Summer Olympics
Olympic footballers of Morocco
1972 African Cup of Nations players
1976 African Cup of Nations players
1978 African Cup of Nations players
People from Mohammedia
African Footballer of the Year winners
Botola players
Africa Cup of Nations-winning players
Association football forwards
SCC Mohammédia players
Mediterranean Games competitors for Morocco